The Little Yellow House is a 1928 American romance film directed by James Leo Meehan and written by Dorothy Yost, Charles Kerr and Randolph Bartlett. It is based on the 1928 novel The Little Yellow House by Beatrice Burton Morgan. The film stars Orville Caldwell, Martha Sleeper, Lucy Beaumont, William Orlamond, Edward Peil Jr. and Freeman Wood. The film was released on April 18, 1928, by Film Booking Offices of America.

Cast       
Orville Caldwell as Rob Hollis
Martha Sleeper as Emmy Milburn
Lucy Beaumont as Mrs. Milburn
William Orlamond as Mr. Milburn
Edward Peil Jr. as Perry Milburn
Freeman Wood as Wells Harbison 
Edythe Chapman as Grandmother Pentland

References

External links
 

1928 films
American romance films
1920s romance films
Film Booking Offices of America films
American silent feature films
American black-and-white films
Films directed by James Leo Meehan
1920s English-language films
1920s American films